Jungle Operations Training Center
Junior Officer Training Course
Joke Of The Century